Senator Brady may refer to:

Members of the United States Senate
James H. Brady (1862–1918), U.S. Senator from Idaho
Nicholas F. Brady (born 1930), U.S. Senator from New Jersey

United States state senate members
Bill Brady (politician) (born 1961), Illinois State Senate
Dan Brady (Ohio politician) (fl. 1980s–2010s), Ohio State Senate
John Leeford Brady (1866–1933), Kansas State Senate
John Thomas Brady (1830–1890), Texas State Senate